A combinatorial map is a combinatorial representation of a graph on an orientable surface. A combinatorial map may also be called a combinatorial embedding, a rotation system, an orientable ribbon graph, a fat graph, or a cyclic graph. More generally, an -dimensional combinatorial map 
is a combinatorial representation of a graph on an -dimensional orientable manifold.

Combinatorial maps are used as efficient data structures in image representation and processing, in geometrical modeling. This model is related to simplicial complexes and to combinatorial topology. A combinatorial map is a boundary representation model; it represents object by its boundaries.

History

The concept of a combinatorial map was introduced informally by J. Edmonds for polyhedral surfaces which are planar graphs. It was given its first definite formal expression under the name "Constellations" by A. Jacques but the concept was already extensively used under the name "rotation" by Gerhard Ringel and J.W.T. Youngs in their famous solution of the Heawood map-coloring problem. The term "constellation" was not retained and instead "combinatorial map" was favored. 

Combinatorial maps were later generalized to represent higher-dimensional orientable subdivided objects.

Motivation
Several applications require a data structure to represent the subdivision of an object. For example, a 2D object can be decomposed into vertices (0-cells), edges (1-cells), and faces (2-cells).  More generally, an n-dimensional object is composed with cells of dimension 0 to n. Moreover, it is also often necessary to represent neighboring relations between these cells.

Thus, we want to describe all the cells of the subdivision, plus all the incidence and adjacency relations between these cells.  When all the represented cells are simplexes, a simplicial complex may be used, but when we want to represent any type of cells, we need to use cellular topological models like combinatorial maps or generalized maps.

Definition

A combinatorial map is a triplet M = (D, σ, α) such that:
 D is a finite set of darts;
 σ is a permutation on D;
 α is an involution on D with no fixed point.

Intuitively, a combinatorial map corresponds to a graph where each edge is subdivided into two darts (sometimes also called half-edges).  The permutation σ gives, for each dart, the next dart by turning around the vertex in the positive orientation; the other permutation α gives, for each dart, the other dart of the same edge.

α allows one to retrieve edges (alpha for arête in French), and σ allows one to retrieve vertices (sigma for sommet in French).  We define φ = σ o α which gives, for each dart, the next dart of the same face (phi for face also in French).

So, there are two ways to represent a combinatorial map depending if the permutation is σ or φ (see example below). These two representations are dual to each other: vertices and faces are exchanged.

Higher-dimensional generalization

An n-dimensional combinatorial map (or n-map) is a (n + 1)-tuple M = (D, β1, ..., βn) such that:
 D is a finite set of darts;
 β1 is a permutation on D;
 β2, ..., βn are involutions on D;
 βi o βj is an involution if i + 2 ≤ j (i, j ∈ { 1, ,..., n }).

An n-dimensional combinatorial map represents the subdivision of a closed orientable n-dimensional space.  The constraint on βi o βj guarantees the topological validity of the map as a quasi-manifold subdivision. Two-dimensional combinatorial maps can be retrieved by fixing n = 2 and renaming σ by β1 and α by β2.

Spaces that are not necessarily closed or orientable may be represented using (n-dimensional) generalized maps.

See also
 Bollobás–Riordan polynomial
 Boundary representation
 Generalized maps
 Doubly connected edge list
 Quad-edge data structure
 Rotation system
 Simplicial complex
 Winged edge

References

External links 
 Combinatorial maps in CGAL, the Computational Geometry Algorithms Library:
 

 Combinatorial maps in CGoGN, Combinatorial and Geometric modeling with Generic N-dimensional Maps
 

Algebraic topology
Topological graph theory
Computer graphics data structures
Graph data structures
Planar graphs